Cooter may refer to:

Arts and entertainment
 The Cooters, an American rock band
 Cooter, the original name of the punk band Autopilot Off
 "Cooter" (30 Rock), a television episode
 Cooter Davenport, a character from the TV show The Dukes of Hazzard and subsequent movie
 Cooter Fingerwood, a character on the TV show Pete & Pete
 Cooter, a coyote character from the Canadian children's television show Size Small

People
 Robert Cooter (born 1945), economics and law professor
 Jim Bob Cooter (born 1984), offensive coordinator of the New York Jets

Other uses
 Cooter turtle (genus Pseudemys)
 Cooter, Missouri, a US city
 Cooter Township, Pemiscot County, Missouri, an inactive township named after the city
 Cooter Brown, a name used in metaphors for drunkenness
 A slang term for the vulva